Florence National Cemetery is a United States National Cemetery located in the city of Florence, South Carolina. Administered by the United States Department of Veterans Affairs, it encompasses , and as of 2021, had over 12,000 interments.

History
The cemetery was originally created on land appropriated, and later purchased, by the federal government.  The land was first owned by James H. Jarrott and was a quarter of a mile from the Florence Stockade. It became a National Cemetery in 1865, and remains from nearby Civil War battlefield cemeteries were transferred and reinterred there.

Florence National Cemetery was listed in the National Register of Historic Places in 1998.

Notable interments
 Florena Budwin, a woman who donned a Union uniform and pretended to be a man so she could serve alongside her husband, who was a Captain, in the Civil War. Her husband was killed and she was captured by the Confederate forces, and served as a nurse at the Florence prisoner of war camp until her death.
 Boatswain's Mate First Class James Elliott Williams, Medal of Honor recipient for action in the Vietnam War.

References

External links

 National Cemetery Administration
 Florence National Cemetery
 
 
 

Cemeteries on the National Register of Historic Places in South Carolina
Historic American Landscapes Survey in South Carolina
Buildings and structures in Florence, South Carolina
United States national cemeteries
South Carolina in the American Civil War
Protected areas of Florence County, South Carolina
National Register of Historic Places in Florence County, South Carolina